Donnie Neuenberger (born August 10, 1962) is an American professional stock car racing driver. Neuenberger is a cancer survivor. During the 2004 season, he was diagnosed after nerves were pinched by the tumor during a race.

Racing career

NASCAR

Nationwide Series
Neuenberger made his Busch Series debut at Lowe's Motor Speedway in fall 2002. With his alma mater, the University of Maryland, College Park on the No. 77 Moy Racing Ford, he started in 41st and finished 26th.

Neuenberger was then able to run more races in 2003, as most of his NASCAR Craftsman Truck Series schedule emptied out. Driving Moy Racing and Means Racing (No. 52), he improved on his debut with a 20th place in the season opener at Daytona. He was 21st at Talladega, 42nd at Dover Downs and 30th at Daytona in the July race for Moy. In two races for Means Racing, he finished 41st at Texas and 36th at Dover Downs.

Neuenberger planned to compete in a full season run in 2004. With sponsorship from BG Products, Neuenberger made and ran the first five races of 2004. However, it did not go too well. His best finish in that span was 33rd at Rockingham and that race was the only one he finished. After not qualifying for two races with the team, Neuenberger made his final race of the season at Talladega, where he matched his best finish of the year, 33rd and had his best start, 30th. In 2005, Neuenberger flipped at Dover International Speedway, but was uninjured. Surprisingly, he became more popular among fans.

After Talladega, Neuenberger was diagnosed with cancer. The chemotherapy and the recovery forced Neuenberger out for the rest of the year.

However, Neuenberger was able to return to the track made in what many consider a feel-good story. MacDonald Motorsports No. 72 team invited him back to Daytona to drive the P4OT.com Chevy. Neuenberger jumped at the chance and enjoyed brief media limelight for his jump back to the track. After qualifying 37th, Neuenberger was running mid-pack before engine problems showed and finished 38th. Means Racing wanted Neuenberger back as well. He would drive both races at Dover Downs for the team. He finished 39th in both races. Notably, in the fall, Neuenberger was involved in a 13-car pileup on lap 2. His No. 52 Plan B Technologies Ford flipped twice before landing on all four wheels, allowing Neuenberger to drive away.

In 2008, Neuenberger finished 14th position at Talladega sponsored by Royal Farms Gas Stations, his highest finishing Nationwide spot ever following a top 25 in Dover last fall with planbtech.net on board.

In 2009, he ran three more races for Means Racing, earning a best finish of 28th.

For 2010, Neuenberger drove part-time in the No. 52 IHOP Chevrolet for Means in one race at Talladega.

Neuenberger has not raced in the series since 2013 at Dover.

Camping World Truck Series
Neuenberger made his NASCAR debut in the inaugural Craftsman Truck Series race at Daytona in 2000. He started the race in 26th position in the No. 84 eBay Ford. However, Neuenberger was able to avoid a large wreck and drove home in 9th position. In addition to the season opener, Nueunberger drove in the 2000 season finale. After starting 34th, Neuenberger took the No. 51 Line-X Chevy to a 30th-place position.

His runs in 2000 earned him a part-time ride in 2001. He returned to Daytona, driving the No. 51 Baltimore Ravens Chevy, finishing 15th. That would be his best finish in 2001. He ran 5 other races with sponsorship from IHOP. He was 28th at Darlington Speedway, 30th at Dover Downs, 19th at Texas, 26th at Richmond and 36th in the fall race at Texas. His best qualifying effort came in the spring race at Texas, where he started 19th.

Neuenberger and IHOP would also return for two races in 2002. He was 25th at Daytona and 29th at Texas, where he had his best qualifying effort of 29th for 2002. He did not finish either race due to crashes.

Neuenberger drove two races in 2003 for Rodney Smith, owner of the No. 66 Dodge. At Charlotte and at Texas, Neuenberger finished in the 25th position. His better qualifying effort came at Texas, where he started 23rd.

Neuenberger finished 14th position at Talladega sponsored by Royal Farms Gas Stations, his highest finishing Nationwide spot ever following a top 25 in Dover last fall with planbtech.net on board. In 2010, he finished 9th in the season opener at Daytona International Speedway in the No. 6 EZ-Slider Chevrolet for Rick Ware Racing. It was his first in 10 years at the same circuit along with the same finish. Neuenberger is scheduled to drive the No. 6 in select races throughout the season.

Other series
Since 2001, Neuenberger has run four races in the NASCAR K&N Pro Series East, all at Dover International Speedway. His best finish was 20th in 2006.

Motorsports career results

NASCAR
(key) (Bold – Pole position awarded by qualifying time. Italics – Pole position earned by points standings or practice time. * – Most laps led.)

Nextel Cup Series

Nationwide Series

Camping World Truck Series

ARCA Racing Series
(key) (Bold – Pole position awarded by qualifying time. Italics – Pole position earned by points standings or practice time. * – Most laps led.)

References

External links
 
 

Living people
1962 births
People from Brandywine, Maryland
Racing drivers from Maryland
NASCAR drivers
Sportspeople from the Washington metropolitan area